Mrinalini Sinha (born February 27, 1960) is the Alice Freeman Palmer Professor in the Department of History and Professor (by courtesy) in the Departments of English and Women's Studies of the University of Michigan. She writes on various aspects of the political history of colonial India, with a focus on anti-colonialism and on gender. She was the president of the Association for Asian Studies, 2014–2015. She is the recipient of the 2012 John Simon Guggenheim Memorial Foundation Fellowship. She has served, and continues to serve, on the editorial board of several academic journals, including the American Historical Review, Past and Present, Gender and History, Journal of Imperial and Commonwealth History, Indian Economic and Social History Review, and History of the Present.

Sinha is currently co-editing two book seriesCritical Perspectives on Empire [co-edited with Catherine Hall and Kathleen Wilson] with Cambridge University Press and Critical Perspectives in South Asian History [co-edited with Janaki Nair and Shabnum Tejani] with Bloomsbury Academic. She is also co-editing [with David Gilmartin and Prasannan Parthasarthi] the two-volume Cambridge History of the Modern Indian Sub-Continent (forthcoming). 

Sinha's partner is historian Clement Hawes. Her father was Srinivas Kumar Sinha, an Indian Army general and former Governor of the Indian states of Jammu and Kashmir and Assam. Her sister, Manisha Sinha, is Draper Chair in American History at the University of Connecticut. A second sister, now retired, was the founder-principal of a leading bilingual (Spanish-English) school in Spain. Her brother, Yashvardhan Kumar Sinha, is the former High Commissioner of India to the United Kingdom and now serves as a Central Information Commissioner of India.

Education 
She got her Master's degree from Jawaharlal Nehru University, New Delhi, India and a Ph.D. from the [[State University of New York at Stony Brook]], [[United States]].

Major publications
Political Imaginaries in Twentieth Century India (co-edited with Manu Goswami), Bloomsbury Academic, 2022
Specters of Mother India: The Global Restructuring of an Empire, Duke University Press, 2006
 Gender and Nation, American Historical Review, 2006
 Colonial Masculinity: The 'manly Englishman' and the 'effeminate Bengali' in the late 19th century, Manchester University Press, 1995

Book awards 
Albion Book Prize, (2007) awarded annually by the North American Conference on British Studies
Joan Kelly Memorial Prize (2007) awarded annually by the American Historical Association

External links 
 Department of History, University of Michigan, Ann Arbor
 Curriculum Vitae, 2022
 Jyotsna Uppal, "Teaching Across Borders," Radical History Review: 91 (2005): 165-169

1960 births
Living people
University of Michigan faculty
Presidents of the Association for Asian Studies
Stony Brook University alumni